The 2000 goracing.com 500 was the 23rd stock car race of the 2000 NASCAR Winston Cup Series and the 40th iteration of the event. The race was held on Saturday, August 26, 2000, Bristol, Tennessee at Bristol Motor Speedway, a 0.533 miles (0.858 km) permanent oval-shaped racetrack. The race took the scheduled 500 laps to complete. At race's end, Rusty Wallace, driving for Penske-Kranefuss Racing would manage to take the lead on the final restart with 40 to go to win his 53rd career NASCAR Winston Cup Series win and his fourth and final win of the season. To fill out the podium, Tony Stewart of Joe Gibbs Racing and Mark Martin of Roush Racing would finish second and third, respectively.

Background 

The Bristol Motor Speedway, formerly known as Bristol International Raceway and Bristol Raceway, is a NASCAR short track venue located in Bristol, Tennessee. Constructed in 1960, it held its first NASCAR race on July 30, 1961. Despite its short length, Bristol is among the most popular tracks on the NASCAR schedule because of its distinct features, which include extraordinarily steep banking, an all concrete surface, two pit roads, and stadium-like seating. It has also been named one of the loudest NASCAR tracks.

Entry list 

 (R) denotes rookie driver.

Practice

First practice 
The first practice session was held on Friday, August 25, at 12:45 PM EST. The session would last for two hours and 45 minutes.

Second practice 
The second practice session was held on Saturday, August 26, at 11:30 AM EST. The session would last for one hour and 30 minutes.

Third and final practice 
The final practice session, sometimes referred to as Happy Hour, was held on Saturday, August 26, at 2:15 PM EST. The session would last for one hour.

Qualifying 
Qualifying was split into two rounds. The first round was held on Friday, August 25, at 5:00 PM EST. Each driver would have two laps to set a fastest time; the fastest of the two would count as their official qualifying lap. During the first round, the top 25 drivers in the round would be guaranteed a starting spot in the race. If a driver was not able to guarantee a spot in the first round, they had the option to scrub their time from the first round and try and run a faster lap time in a second round qualifying run, held on Saturday, August 26, at 1:45 PM EST. As with the first round, each driver would have two laps to set a fastest time; the fastest of the two would count as their official qualifying lap. Positions 26-36 would be decided on time, while positions 37-43 would be based on provisionals. Six spots are awarded by the use of provisionals based on owner's points. The seventh is awarded to a past champion who has not otherwise qualified for the race. If no past champion needs the provisional, the next team in the owner points will be awarded a provisional.

Four drivers would fail to qualify: Mike Bliss, Hut Stricklin, Carl Long, and Ricky Craven.

Full qualifying results

Race results

References 

2000 NASCAR Winston Cup Series
NASCAR races at Bristol Motor Speedway
August 2000 sports events in the United States
2000 in sports in Tennessee